"Déjà vu" is a song by Blue System. It is the first track on their 1991 sixth studio album, Déjà vu, and was released as its lead single.

The single debuted at number 75 in Germany for the week of September 23, 1991, rising to number 14 two weeks later and then peaking at number 12 for two weeks.

Composition 
The song is written and produced by Dieter Bohlen.

Charts

References 

1991 songs
1991 singles
Blue System songs
Hansa Records singles
Songs written by Dieter Bohlen
Song recordings produced by Dieter Bohlen